Trichophorum clintonii, the Clinton's bulrush, is a plant species native to Canada and the northeastern United States. It has been reported from Alberta, Saskatchewan, Ontario, Québec, New Brunswick, Maine, New York State, Michigan, Wisconsin, and Minnesota.

Culms are triangular in cross-section. The inflorescences is one brown spikelet with three to six flowers.

References

clintonii
Flora of Alberta
Flora of Saskatchewan
Flora of Ontario
Flora of Quebec
Flora of New Brunswick
Flora of Maine
Flora of New York (state)
Flora of Michigan
Flora of Wisconsin
Flora of Minnesota
Flora without expected TNC conservation status